During the 2015 Greek bailout referendum a number of newspapers, individuals, politicians, political parties and organisations in Greece, Europe and internationally issued endorsements for either 'NO' to accepting the Troika bailout terms or 'YES'.

Politicians

No
Alexis Tsipras, then prime minister of Greece and leader of the SYRIZA party
Jeremy Corbyn, Leader of the British Labour Party
Tom Copley, Labour Party member of the London Assembly
Diane Abbott, British Labour Party MP and candidate for Mayor of London
Bernie Sanders, U.S. Senator and candidate for President of the United States

Yes
Giorgos Kaminis, mayor of Athens
Yiannis Boutaris, mayor of Thessaloniki
Andy Burnham, British Labour Party politician and mayor of Manchester
Jean-Claude Juncker, President of the European Commission
Martin Schulz, German MEP and President of the European Parliament
Antonis Samaras, Former Prime Minister of Greece and then leader of the New Democracy Party
Kostas Karamanlis, Former Prime Minister of Greece and former leader of the New Democracy Party
Angela Merkel, Chancellor of Germany

Individuals

No
Thomas Piketty, French economist
George Galloway, British politician and broadcaster
Paul Krugman, American Nobel Prize winning economist
Owen Jones, British socialist newspaper columnist, political activist and writer
Joseph Stiglitz, American Nobel Prize winning economist
Jeffrey Sachs, economist
Steve Keen, British-based economist and author
Max Keiser, British-based broadcaster, financial commentator and film maker
Kim Dotcom, German-Finnish internet entrepreneur, businessperson and political activist
Harry Leslie Smith, British writer, political activist and former RAF fighter in World War II
Tariq Ali, British writer, film-maker and journalist

Yes
Christopher Pissarides, Cypriot-British Nobel Prize winning economist
Ieronymos II of Athens, Archbishop of Athens, primate of the Church of Greece
Sakis Rouvas, Greek Singer

Political parties

This is the official list of endorsements by political parties as it was released by the Ministry of Interior:

No
 Syriza, governing party of Greece
 Independent Greeks, governing party of Greece
 Golden Dawn, parliamentary opposition party in Greece
 Anticapitalist Left Cooperation for the Overthrow, minor party
 Agricultural Party of Greece, minor party
 United Popular Front, minor party
 Popular Unions of Bipartisan Social Groups, minor party

Yes
 New Democracy, opposition party
 To Potami, opposition party
 Panhellenic Socialist Movement, opposition party
 Democratic Left, minor party
 Movement of Democratic Socialists (KIDISO), minor party
 Recreate Greece, minor party

Others
Apart from the parties listed above, the Communist Party of Greece called for the use of a write-in ballot option, "even if they say that it is a spoiled ballot". The Communist Party of Greece (Marxist-Leninist) and the Marxist-Leninist Communist Party of Greece ran a joint campaign for a boycott of the vote. The Organization for the Reconstruction of the Communist Party of Greece also called for a boycott of the vote, calling it a 'fascist farce'.

Newspapers

No
The News Line, British Trotskyist daily newspaper
Morning Star, British socialist daily newspaper

Organisations

No
Greece Solidarity Campaign, British-based solidarity organisation
People's Assembly Against Austerity, British political campaign

Yes
Technical Chamber of Greece
Athens Bar Association
Panhellenic Federation of Teaching and Research Staff
Central Union of Greek Municipalities
Greek Regions Union

References

2015 in Greek politics
Greek government-debt crisis
Bailout referendum